Cloroformo: Los peores golpes se dan abajo del ring, or simply Cloroformo is a Mexican sports boxing drama television series created by Gustavo Loza, and produced by Adicta Films for Televisa Networks. The series consists of 13 episodes of one hour and is stars Álex Perea, Gustavo Sánchez Parra, Zuria Vega, Osvaldo Benavides, and Tenoch Huerta. It premiered on 12 March 2012 on Televisa Deportes Network, and on 22 March 2012 on Golden Latin America. Although Televisa Deportes Network authorized the series for a second season, the production of the second season of the series was never done.

Cast 
 Tenoch Huerta as El Búfalo
 Zuria Vega as Valerie
 Gustavo Sánchez Parra as Gomorra
 Osvaldo Benavides as Joe
 Manuel "Flaco" Ibáñez as Don Roque
 Vanessa Bauche as Mirella
 María Rojo as Doña Consuelo
 Ilithya Manzanilla as Paula
 Álex Perea as Asís

Episodes

References

External links 
 

Mexican television series
Televisa original programming
2012 Mexican television series debuts
2012 Mexican television series endings
Spanish-language television shows